Kristianstad Nation is one of thirteen student nations at Lund University, Sweden. The name comes from the city Kristianstad in Scania. The nation has several weekly activities such as lunch, pub, sittning, club and brunch. Food and beverage events always have student price and is very popular. Also, Nationes sports and activities group coordinates various activities such as power walks and volleyball tournament. Nations FAMN group have special events where you can be with everything from swimming to visit spääx performances.

Originally, all Scanian people enrolled in the Scanian Nation (or Skånska nationen). As that nation grew, it became necessary in 1890 to split it in five parts: Lunds Nation, Malmö Nation, Helsingkrona Nation, Sydskånska Nation and Kristianstads Nation. Nowadays, however, a student's origin plays only a small part when choosing what nation to belong to.

The 17th century pro-Danish Scanian partisan Snapphane is the symbol of the nation, and the Nation arms, annual festivities and other activities all bear the name Snapphane. Kristianstad was historically located in the  area where the Snapphane resided.

External links 
 Official site

Nations at Lund University